Pampa Guanaco Airport   is a rural airport near Inútil Bay, serving Camerón in the Timaukel commune, part of the Tierra del Fuego province in the Magallanes Region of Chile.

There is a low ridge south and west of the runway.

See also

Transport in Chile
List of airports in Chile

References

External links
OpenStreetMap - Pampa Guanaco
OurAirports - Pampa Guanaco
SkyVector - Pampa Guanaco
FallingRain - Pampa Guanaco Airport

Airports in Chile
Airports in Tierra del Fuego Province, Chile